The Play-offs of the 2018 Fed Cup Americas Zone Group II were the final stages of the Group II Zonal Competition involving teams from the Americas. Using the positions determined in their pools, the thirteen teams faced off to determine their placing in the 2018 Fed Cup Americas Zone Group II. The top two teams advanced to Group I in 2019.

Pool results

Promotional play-offs 
The first placed teams of the four pools were drawn in head-to-head rounds. The winners advanced to Group I.

Mexico vs. Peru

Ecuador vs. Bahamas

Third to fourth place play-offs 
The second placed teams of the four pools were drawn in head-to-head rounds to determine the 3rd to 4th placings.

Dominican Republic vs. Cuba

Costa Rica vs. Bolivia

Fifth to sixth place play-offs 
The third placed teams of the four pools were drawn in head-to-head rounds to determine the 5th to 6th placings.

Uruguay vs. Barbados

Honduras vs. Triniad and Tobago

Final placements 

  and  advanced to Americas Zone Group I in 2019.

See also 
 Fed Cup structure

References

External links 
 Fed Cup website

P2